Sir Clifford Clarence Campbell   (28 June 189228 September 1991) was a Jamaican educator and politician who served as speaker of the House and President of the Senate. In 1962, after Jamaica achieved independence, he was appointed as the first Jamaica-born  and second governor-general of Jamaica, serving in that position for more than a decade.

Early life and family
Clifford Campbell was born in Petersfield, Jamaica on 28 June 1892, the son of civil servant James Campbell and his wife Blance (née Ruddock). He was educated at Petersfield Elementary School and Mico Teachers' College. He became a schoolteacher and later was promoted to principal of three schools and headmaster in the parish. On 1 August 1920, Campbell married Alice Estephene. They had four children.

Political career and death
Campbell served as principal of the Grange Hill Government School from 1928 to 1944. In 1944, Campbell entered electoral politics as a member of the recently founded Jamaica Labour Party. He ran a successful campaign for a seat in the House of Representatives and chaired the House Committee on Education from 1945 to 1949. From 1945 to 1954, he was the Vice-President of the Elected Members' Association. In 1950, Campbell was elected as Speaker of the House. In 1962, he was elected as president of the Senate, serving from 31 August 1962 to 30 November 1962 after the nation became independent. A few months after independence, on 1 December 1962, Campbell was sworn in as Governor-General, succeeding Kenneth Blackburne. Campbell became the first Jamaican-born Governor-General and served until 2 March 1973. He died on 28 September 1991 at the age of 99.

Other ventures and recognition
Campbell was enthusiastic about the arts as well as community service. He sat on a number of boards, including the Board of Visitors to Sav-la-Mar Public Hospital, the Advisory Committee of the Knockalva Practical Training Centre, the Westmoreland School Board, the Westmoreland Rice Growers' Association, and the Manchester Committee of the Western Federation of Teachers. Additionally, Campbell was also a member of clubs and societies as the Jamaica National Choral and Orchestral Society, the Jamaica Youth Clubs Council, and the Jamaica Flying Club, of which he was president. He also contributed to other organisations such as the Jamaica Agricultural Society, the Jamaica Cancer Society, and the Jamaica Football Federation. Campbell was awarded the Order of the Nation (ON) and the Order of Saint John. He was also knighted by Queen Elizabeth II, first as Knight Grand Cross of the Order of St. Michael and St. George and later as Knight Grand Cross of the Royal Victorian Order.

References

1892 births
1991 deaths
Governors-General of Jamaica
Members of the House of Representatives of Jamaica
Members of the Senate of Jamaica
Knights Grand Cross of the Order of St Michael and St George
Knights Grand Cross of the Royal Victorian Order
Knights of the Order of St John
Recipients of the Order of the Nation
Jamaica Labour Party politicians
Speakers of the House of Representatives of Jamaica
Alumni of Mico University College